Nalavadi is a village in Dharwad district of Karnataka, India.

Demographics 
As of the 2011 Census of India there were 799 households in Nalavadi and a total population of 3,658 consisting of 1,876 males and 1,782 females. There were 382 children ages 0-6.

References

 this village is gud for education, it is a  village near to hubli dharwad .............

Villages in Dharwad district